Neuropsychiatric systemic lupus erythematosus or NPSLE refers to the neurological and psychiatric manifestations of systemic lupus erythematosus. SLE is a disease in which the immune system attacks the body's own cells and tissues. It can affect various organs or systems of the body. It is estimated that over half of people with SLE have neuropsychiatric involvement.

Classification
The American College of Rheumatology (ACR) has outlined 19 syndromes that are seen in NPSLE. These syndromes encompass disorders of the central and peripheral nervous systems:

Aseptic meningitis 
Cerebrovascular disease 
Demyelinating syndrome
Headache
Movement disorder
Myelopathy
Seizure disorders
Acute confusional state
Anxiety disorder
Cognitive dysfunction
Mood disorder
Psychosis

Acute inflammatory demyelinating polyradiculoneuropathy
Autonomic disorder
Mononeuropathy (single/multiplex)
Myasthenia gravis
Cranial neuropathy
Plexopathy
Polyneuropathy

Each of the 19 syndromes are also stand-alone diagnoses, which can occur with or without lupus.

The majority of cases involve the central nervous system (CNS), which consists of the brain and spinal cord. The most common CNS syndromes are headache and mood disorder.

Though neuropsychiatric lupus is sometimes referred to as "CNS lupus", it can also affect the peripheral nervous system (PNS). Between 10-15% of people with NPSLE have PNS involvement. Mononeuropathy and polyneuropathy are the most common PNS syndromes.

Other syndromes
Some neurological syndromes outside of the ACR classification may also be considered NPSLE manifestations. These include neuromyelitis optica, posterior reversible encephalopathy syndrome, small fiber neuropathy, and Lambert–Eaton myasthenic syndrome.

Pathogenesis
There are several possible mechanisms that underlie the nervous system manifestations of lupus. Specific syndromes may be vasculopathic, autoantibody-mediated, or inflammatory in nature.

There is evidence that the blood–brain barrier, which protects the central nervous system, is compromised in patients with NPSLE. As a result of this, autoantibodies are able to infiltrate the CNS and cause damage.

Diagnosis
For diagnosis of NPSLE, it must be determined whether neuropsychiatric symptoms are indeed caused by SLE, whether they constitute a separate comorbid condition, or whether they are an adverse effect of disease treatment. In addition, onset of neuropsychiatric symptoms may happen prior to the diagnosis of lupus. Due to the lack of uniform diagnostic standards, statistics about NPSLE vary widely.

Tests which aid in diagnosis include MRI, electrophysiological studies, psychiatric evaluation, and autoantibody tests.

Treatment
Management of neuropsychiatric lupus is similar to the management of neuropsychiatric disease in patients without lupus. Treatment depends on the underlying causes of a patient’s disease, and may include immunosuppressants, anticoagulants, and symptomatic therapy.

See also
Lupus headache

References

Neurological disorders
Autoimmune diseases